This table   shows the number of National Treasures of Japan in each prefecture grouped by   type of the property. Gold colored cells mark prefectures with the   largest number of National Treasures for the given category (column).

References

National Treasures of Japan